The Orthodox Christian Mission Center (OCMC) is an Orthodox Christian missions organization based in the United States and supported by all the jurisdictions of the Assembly of Canonical Orthodox Bishops of the United States of America.

Current missionaries 

 Floyd and Ancuţa Frantz
 Georgia Gilman-Bendo
 Hoppe Family
 Anastasia Pamela Barksdale
 Christina Semon
 Maria Roeber
 Felice Stewart
 Hargrave Family
 Monk Job (Roden)
 Kurt Bringerud
 Faith Young

External links
 Official website

Eastern Orthodox organizations
Christian missions in North America